Alfred Thommesen (2 June 1914  – 31 December 1988) was a Norwegian shipowner and politician for the Conservative Party.

He was born in Flosta.

He was elected to the Norwegian Parliament from Aust-Agder in 1958, and was re-elected on three occasions.

Thommesen was a member of Flosta municipality council between 1945 and 1947, and later served as deputy mayor in the periods 1951–1955 and 1955–1958.

References

1914 births
1988 deaths
Members of the Storting
Conservative Party (Norway) politicians
Aust-Agder politicians
Norwegian businesspeople in shipping
20th-century Norwegian politicians